Patreksfjörður ("Patrick's fjord") is an Icelandic village in the Westfjords with 721 inhabitants (2021 census).

The town was named after Patrick bishop in the Hebrides who was the spiritual guide of Örlygur Hrappson, the original settler in the area who came from the Hebrides. Its economy is mainly based on its  fisheries.

Amenities include a swimming pool, bank, campsite, four guesthouses, a hotel,  two restaurants, two cafes and a gas station. In town is a hospital, police station and the town hall for the Municipality of Vesturbyggd.

Olympian Leiknir Jónsson was born here.

Climate
Patreksfjörður has a tundra climate (ET).

Transport
The nearest airport with scheduled flights is Bíldudalur Airport,  from Patreksfjörður. Eagle Air connects Bíldudalur and Reykjavik with one daily flight. There are scheduled buses from Patreksfjörður to Bíldudalur Airport. The bus also connects Patreksfjörður with nearby villages Bíldudalur and Tálknafjörður.

References

External links
 More information and photos about Patreksfjörður on Hit Iceland

Populated places in Westfjords